Sieta Posthumus (born 22 April 1936) is a retired Dutch freestyle swimmer who participated in the 1960 Summer Olympics in the 4×100 m freestyle relay. Her team was expected to compete for medals, but was disqualified in the preliminary round because she jumped in water while her team mate, Jopie Troost, had not yet completed her leg. During the warm up, Posthumus hit the wall of the pool with her head, and it was revealed later that she suffered a concussion. She retired from swimming six months after the Games.

References

1936 births
Living people
Swimmers at the 1960 Summer Olympics
Olympic swimmers of the Netherlands
Dutch female freestyle swimmers
Sportspeople from Leeuwarden